Roland Agalliu (born 5 July 1961) is an Albanian retired football player. He was the first foreigner to play in the Romanian First League after the Romanian Revolution.

Honours
Labinoti
Albanian Superliga: 1983–84
Partizani Tirana
Albanian Superliga: 1986–87
Universitatea Craiova
Divizia A: 1990–91
Cupa României: 1990–91

Personal
Roland currently resides in Graz, Austria with his spouse and daughter.

References

1961 births
Living people
Footballers from Tirana
Albanian footballers
Albanian men's footballers
Association football forwards
Kategoria Superiore players
Liga I players
FK Dinamo Tirana players
FK Partizani Tirana players
CS Universitatea Craiova players
ASC Oțelul Galați players
Albanian expatriate footballers
Expatriate footballers in Romania
Albanian expatriate sportspeople in Romania